Chuluut River (stony river) is a river flowing through the valleys of the Khangai Mountains in central Mongolia, and a tributary of the Ider River. It is 415 km long, the width at the mouth into the Ider river is 80 m, the maximum depth is 3 m. It is usually frozen from November to April.

References

M.Nyamaa, Khövsgöl aimgiin lavlakh toli, Ulaanbaatar 2001

Rivers of Mongolia
Khövsgöl Province